The 1981 SEC women's basketball tournament took place January 29 though February 1, 1981 in Baton Rouge, Louisiana.

Auburn won the tournament by beating Alabama in the championship game.

Tournament

Asterisk denotes game ended in overtime.

All-Tournament team 
Mary Beasly, Alabama
Leslie Payne, Alabama
Becky Jackson, Auburn (MVP)
Angie Hannah, Auburn
Valerie Still, Kentucky

References

SEC women's basketball tournament
1981 in sports in Louisiana
Sports competitions in Baton Rouge, Louisiana
College basketball tournaments in Louisiana